Slobodan Novaković (born 15 October 1986) is a Serbian footballer.

References

External links
 
 Slobodan Novaković stats at utakmica.rs 
 

1986 births
Living people
Serbian footballers
FK Vojvodina players
RFK Novi Sad 1921 players
FK Hajduk Kula players
FK Spartak Subotica players
FK Proleter Novi Sad players
FK Kabel players
Serbian SuperLiga players
Serbian First League players
Sportspeople from Subotica
Association football midfielders